Rapanea myrtillina  is a flowering plant in the family Primulaceae. The specific epithet comes from a fancied resemblance of the leaves to those of the myrtle genus Myrtus.

Description
It is a shrub, growing to 3 m in height. The oblanceolate to narrowly oblanceolate leaves are 8–25 mm long and 3–12 mm wide. The small flowers are cream with dark pink spots. The round purple fruits are 3.5–4 mm in diameter.

Distribution and habitat
The plant is endemic to Australia’s subtropical Lord Howe Island in the Tasman Sea, where it is rare upland inhabitant, being found from an elevation of about 400 m upwards to the summits of Mounts Lidgbird and Gower at the southern end of the island.

References

myrtillina
Endemic flora of Lord Howe Island
Ericales of Australia
Plants described in 1902
Taxa named by Carl Christian Mez